Adesmia microphylla, pahuen, is a common shrub in Coastal Chilean Matorral of Central Chile, 400 to 1000 masl., associates with Proustia pungens and Lithrea caustica. This species was merged as A. arborea, a taxon including A. confusa Ulibarri, a distinctive plant with flowers over brachyblasts. The flowers of A. microphylla appear over spines.

Use
As livestock forage.

References

microphylla
Flora of the Chilean Matorral
Flora of Chile